Marquess Inoue Kaoru  (井上 馨, January 16, 1836 – September 1, 1915) was a Japanese politician and a prominent member of the Meiji oligarchy during the Meiji period of the Empire of Japan. As one of the senior statesmen (Genrō) in Japan during that period, he had a tremendous influence on the selection of the nation's leaders and formation of its policies.

Early years

Born Yakichi (勇吉) to a lower-ranked samurai family in Yuda, Chōshū domain (present day Yamaguchi, Yamaguchi Prefecture), Inoue attended the Meirinkan domain school with his brother Ikutarō (幾太郎). He was a close boyhood friend of Itō Hirobumi who later became Japan's first prime minister, and he played an active part in the sonnō jōi movement. In 1858, he studied rangaku, artillery and swordsmanship in Edo.

In the Bakumatsu period, Inoue emerged as a leader of the anti-foreigner movement in his native Chōshū. Desiring to rid Japan of foreigners, he and Takasugi Shinsaku set fire to the British legation in Edo in January 1863.

Recognizing Japan's need to learn from the Western powers, Inoue joined the Chōshū Five and was smuggled out of Japan to study at University College, London in England in 1863. When he returned with Itō Hirobumi, he unsuccessfully tried to prevent war (the Battle of Shimonoseki) between Chōshū and the Western naval powers over the closing of the Straits of Shimonoseki to foreign shipping. Later, he fought against the forces of the Tokugawa shogunate in the 1864 First Chōshū Expedition, during which he was severely wounded by the attack of the assassins, received a near-fatal injury, appealing to Inoue's elder brother for beheading because of the unbearable pain and finally Ikutaro Tokoro who was then in hiding from the pursuit of Tokugawa shogunate with Prince Sanjō Sanetomi and rushed to Inoue pulled him through this by putting about 50 stitches of tatami needle in the wounds on the whole body without anesthesia because of emergency during the domestic war time (The story that Inoue's mother holding bloody Inoue then dissuaded her elder son from beheading was introduced in the National Japanese text book of the 5th period as the power of mother). He later played a key role in the formation of the Satchō Alliance against the Tokugawa shogunate.

Statesman in the Meiji government

After the Meiji Restoration, Inoue served in several important positions in the new Meiji government. He was appointed Vice Minister of Finance in 1871 and was influential in reorganizing government finances on modern lines, especially in the reform of the land tax system, termination of government stipends to the ex-samurai and former aristocracy and for promoting industrialization. Closely linked to business circles, including the emerging Mitsui zaibatsu, he was also involved in the railway business. These measures created many political enemies, and Inoue was forced to resign in May 1873. Inoue took part in the Osaka Conference of 1875 to support the creation of a representative national assembly.

In 1876, Inoue was asked to assist in the field of foreign affairs, and was involved in the conclusion of the Japan-Korea Treaty of 1876 as vice-ambassador extraordinary and plenipotentiary. He returned to government as Minister of Public Works in 1878 and Lord of Foreign Affairs in 1879 under the early Meiji Dajō-kan Cabinet. In 1884, he was elevated to the rank of count (hakushaku) under the new kazoku peerage system.

In December 1885, Inoue officially became Japan's first Minister of Foreign Affairs bearing that title in the first Itō Hirobumi cabinet. However, Inoue came under public criticism for his failure to negotiate a revision of the unequal treaties, his building of the Rokumeikan, and support of its Westernizing influences, which forced him to resign in August 1887.

Later he served as Minister of Agriculture and Commerce in the Kuroda administration, as Home Minister in the second Itō administration and again as Finance Minister in the 3rd Itō administration.

From 1901 onwards, Inoue served as most senior of the genrō, and considered himself the government's foremost advisor on financial affairs. He was advanced to the title of marquis (kōshaku) in 1907, and died in 1915 at his summer home at Okitsu-juku, Shizuoka prefecture.

Honours
From the article in the Japanese Wikipedia

Japanese
Grand Cordon of the Order of the Rising Sun (February 10, 1879)
Count (July 7, 1884)
Grand Cordon of the Order of the Rising Sun with Paulownia Flowers (October 7, 1895)
Grand Cordon of the Order of the Chrysanthemum (April 1, 1906)
Marquess (September 21, 1907)
Collar of the Order of the Chrysanthemum (September 1, 1915; posthumous)

Foreign
Honorary Knight Grand Cross of the Order of St. Michael and St. George (GCMG) (February 20, 1906)
Grand Cross of the Legion of Honour of France

See also
 List of Ambassadors from Japan to South Korea

References

Further reading
 Akamatsu, Paul. (1972). Meiji 1868: Revolution and Counter-Revolution in Japan (trans., Miriam Kochan). New York: Harper & Row.
 Beasley, William G. (1972). The Meiji Restoration. Stanford: Stanford University Press.
 __. (1995). The Rise of Modern Japan: Political, Economic and Social Change Since 1850. New York: St. Martin's Press.
Cobbing, Andrew (2010). “Inoue Kaoru (1836–1915): A Controversial Meiji Statesman”. in Biographical Portraits. Leiden: BRILL.
 Craig, Albert M. (1961). Chōshū in the Meiji Restoration. Cambridge: Harvard University Press.
 Jansen, Marius B. and Gilbert Rozman, eds. (1986). Japan in Transition: from Tokugawa to Meiji. Princeton: Princeton University Press. ;  OCLC 12311985

External links
 
 National Diet Library bio
 

1836 births
1915 deaths
People from Yamaguchi (city)
People from Chōshū domain
Kazoku
Japanese expatriates in the United Kingdom
Members of the House of Peers (Japan)
Ministers of Finance of Japan
Government ministers of Japan
Foreign ministers of Japan
Ministers of Home Affairs of Japan
Japanese art collectors
Meiji Restoration
People of Meiji-period Japan
Alumni of University College London
Samurai
Mōri retainers
Honorary Knights Grand Cross of the Order of St Michael and St George
Recipients of the Order of the Paulownia Flowers
Grand Cordons of the Order of the Rising Sun